Nokomis is a city in Montgomery County, Illinois, United States. The population was 2,256 at the 2010 census, and 2,126 as of 2018.

Geography

Demographics

As of the census of 2000, there were 2,389 people, 1,031 households, and 630 families residing in the city. The racial makeup of the city was 99.46% White, 0.25% Native American, 0.04% Asian, and 0.25% from two or more races. Hispanic or Latino of any race were 0.17% of the population.

There were 1,031 households, out of which 26.9% had children under the age of 18 living with them, 48.2% were married couples living together, 9.1% had a female householder with no husband present, and 38.8% were non-families. 35.1% of all households were made up of individuals, and 21.1% had someone living alone who was 65 years of age or older. The average household size was 2.21 and the average family size was 2.87.

In the city, the age distribution of the population shows 22.8% under the age of 18, 6.2% from 18 to 24, 24.6% from 25 to 44, 20.9% from 45 to 64, and 25.4% who were 65 years of age or older. The median age was 42 years. For every 100 females, there were 88.1 males. For every 100 females age 18 and over, there were 83.8 males.

The median income for a household in the city was $29,612, and the median income for a family was $36,850. Males had a median income of $35,106 versus $19,844 for females. The per capita income for the city was $16,328. About 10.7% of families and 14.3% of the population were below the poverty line, including 18.9% of those under age 18 and 9.9% of those age 65 or over.

Notable people

 Jim Bottomley, Hall of Fame first baseman who primarily played for the St. Louis Cardinals. He resided in Nokomis as a youth and attended school there as well.
 Reid Detmers, major league pitcher for the Los Angeles Angels, raised in Nokomis
 Bud Foster, defensive coordinator for the Virginia Tech Hokies football team, raised in Nokomis
 Bill Mizeur, pinch hitter for the St. Louis Browns, born in Nokomis
 Red Ruffing, Hall of Fame pitcher who primarily played for the Boston Red Sox and New York Yankees, attended schools and raised in Nokomis
 Charles Turzak, woodcut artist most famous for his Lincoln Wood Cuts, raised in Nokomis.

Recreation
Nokomis is home to 3 public parks: Nokomis Community Memorial Park, Fred B. Johnson Nokomis City Park and the Shane P. Cole Memorial Park. Ramsey State Park is about 20 miles away from Nokomis. The park offers fishing, camping, group camping, horseback riding, hiking trails, and three playgrounds.

Media
 Nokomis Free Press-Progress, Nokomis' longstanding print newspaper since 1918
 Heartland Newsfeed, a digital news company based in Nokomis since 2016

References

External links
Nokomis Community Unit School District #22
Historical Society of Montgomery County Illinois
The Centennial history of Nokomis, Illinois, 1856–1956 
Bottomley-Ruffing-Schalk Museum, baseball museum dedicated to St. Louis Cardinals baseball, as well as the careers of Jim Bottomley, Red Ruffing and Ray Schalk 
City of Nokomis Facebook page

Cities in Montgomery County, Illinois
Cities in Illinois